Carol Barnett may refer to:

 Carol Jenkins Barnett (born 1956, died 2021), American philanthropist and businesswoman
 Carol E. Barnett (born 1949), American composer